Sarah Jarosz (born May 23, 1991) is an American singer-songwriter from Wimberley, Texas. Her first album, Song Up in Her Head, was released in 2009 and the tune "Mansinneedof" was nominated for a Grammy Award in the category of Best Country Instrumental Performance. Her second album, Follow Me Down, released in 2011, received a Song of the Year nomination from the Americana Music Association's 2012 Honors and Awards. Her third album, Build Me Up from Bones, was released on September 24, 2013 through Sugar Hill Records.  Build Me Up from Bones was nominated for Best Folk Album at the 56th Annual Grammy Awards, and its title track was nominated for Best American Roots Song. In 2016 Jarosz released her fourth album, Undercurrent. The album won two Grammy awards (Best Folk Album and Best American Roots Performance for the song "House of Mercy").

On June 5, 2020 she released the album World on the Ground, her first solo album in four years. It was nominated for two Grammy awards (Best American Roots Song and Best Americana Album) with Jarosz winning in the Best Americana Album category.

Early life and education

Jarosz was born in Austin, Texas, and raised in Wimberley, Texas. Her parents were teachers. Her last name is Polish. She began learning the mandolin at age 10 and later began learning to play the guitar, clawhammer banjo, and octave mandolin. During her senior year of high school, Jarosz signed a recording contract with Sugar Hill Records and released her debut album Song Up in Her Head in June 2009; it was produced by Jarosz and Gary Paczosa. Guest musicians on the album included Chris Thile, Darrell Scott, Stuart Duncan, and Jerry Douglas. Jarosz enrolled in the New England Conservatory of Music in 2009, and graduated with honors in 2013 with a degree in Contemporary Improvisation.

Career

In 2010 Jarosz recorded the album Follow Me Down and again shared production duties with Gary Paczosa.  The album was recorded in Nashville and features guest musicians Bela Fleck, Jerry Douglas, Stuart Duncan, Viktor Krauss, Dan Tyminski, Shawn Colvin, Darrell Scott, and bandmates Alex Hargreaves and Nathaniel Smith. A session with Punch Brothers in New York produced a cover of the Radiohead song  "The Tourist". An American Songwriter reviewer wrote that "Jarosz invites us along with her into a growing sonic space of collaboration and artistry at this the second step in what will surely be a long and productive musical journey."
In 2011 Jarosz performed at Jerry Douglas' the Transatlantic Sessions in Scotland. She performed Bob Dylan's "Ring Them Bells."

In 2012, Jarosz appeared on Kate Rusby's album 20, collaborating with Rusby on the song "Planets".

In 2015, Jarosz toured extensively with Sara Watkins (a founding member of Nickel Creek) and Aoife O'Donovan (of Crooked Still fame) as well as going on tour with Garrison Keillor on The America the Beautiful Tour – A Prairie Home Companion. In 2016, she became a regular performer on the weekly National Public Radio series Live from Here, hosted by Chris Thile.

Together with Watkins and O'Donovan, Jarosz became a founding member of the progressive-folk trio I'm With Her. They released their debut album, See You Around, in 2018.

Her fourth studio album, Undercurrent, was released on June 17, 2016. It won the Grammy for Best Folk Album along with the song "House of Mercy" winning the Grammy for Best American Roots Performance at the 2017 Grammy Awards.

In 2020, Jarosz returned to her solo career with her fifth studio album, World on the Ground. This was followed 11 months later by the release of her sixth studio album, Blue Heron Suite. The previously-shelved collection was originally written and recorded between 2017 and 2018.

Reception

Jarosz has been called "a songwriter of uncommon wisdom" by the Austin Chronicle. Jarosz has been interviewed by NPR and Rolling Stone and described as a contemporary-bluegrass prodigy. A New York Times reviewer wrote that Jarosz is "widely regarded as one of acoustic music's most promising young talents: a singer-songwriter and mandolin and banjo prodigy with the taste and poise to strike that rare balance of commercial and critical success."
Her 2013 release, Build Me Up from Bones, was dubbed by Stereo Subversion as an "organic masterwork...a warm, nuanced collection that wraps and enchants the listener", as well as "her boldest work yet" by WNYC Soundcheck.

Discography

Studio albums

Extended plays

Singles

Music videos

Awards and nominations

Americana Music Honors & Awards

|-
| style="text-align:center;" rowspan="1"| 2010
| Sarah Jarosz
| Emerging Artist of the Year
| 
|-
| style="text-align:center;" rowspan="1"| 2011
| Sarah Jarosz
| Instrumentalist of the Year
| 
|-
| style="text-align:center;" rowspan="1"| 2012
| "Come Around"
| Song of the Year
| 
|-
| style="text-align:center;" rowspan="1"| 2014
| Build Me Up from Bones
| Album of the Year
| 
|-
| 2018
| I'm With Her
| Duo/Group of the Year
| 
|}

Grammy Awards

|-
| style="text-align:center;" rowspan="1"| 2009
| "Mansinneedof"
| Best Country Instrumental Performance
| 
|-
| style="text-align:center;" rowspan="2"| 2014
| Build Me Up from Bones
| Best Folk Album
| 
|-
| "Build Me Up from Bones"
| Best American Roots Song
| 
|-
| style="text-align:center;" rowspan="2"| 2017
| Undercurrent
| Best Folk Album
| 
|-
| "House Of Mercy"
| Best American Roots Performance
| 
|-
| style="text-align:center;" rowspan="2"| 2019
| "Call My Name" (I'm With Her)
| Best American Roots Song
| 
|-
| "Call My Name"
| Best American Roots Performance
| 
|-
| style="text-align:center;" rowspan="2"| 2021
| World on the Ground
| Best Americana Album
| 
|-
| "Hometown"
| Best American Roots Song
| 
|-
| 2022
| Blue Heron Suite
| Best Folk Album
| 
|}

References

External links

 Official site
 
 NPR: Various audio recordings of performances and interviews

Living people
Singer-songwriters from Texas
Bluegrass musicians from Texas
American bluegrass mandolinists
American child musicians
American women country singers
American country singer-songwriters
American women singer-songwriters
American people of Polish descent
1991 births
21st-century American singers
Country musicians from Texas
Grammy Award winners
Musicians from Austin, Texas
Sugar Hill Records artists
People from Wimberley, Texas
21st-century American women singers
I'm with Her (band) members